The urinary indices are the fractional sodium excretion (FENa) index and the renal failure index (RFI).

The renal failure index = Urine Sodium * Plasma Creatinine / Urine Creatinine.

References

Urine tests